Furfurylamine is an aromatic amine typically formed by the reductive amination of furfural with ammonia.

The pharmaceutical drug furtrethonium, a parasympathomimetic cholinergic, is a trimethyl ammonium derivative of furfurylamine.

Furfurylamine also has use in the synthesis of Barmastine.

See also
2-Furonitrile - corresponding nitrile
Furan-2-ylmethanethiol - corresponding thiol
Furfuryl alcohol - corresponding alcohol
2-Furoic acid - corresponding carboxylic acid

References

Amines
2-Furyl compounds